Andrés Óscar Ayala (born 13 March 2000) is an Argentine professional footballer who plays as a defensive midfielder for Ferro Carril Oeste, on loan from Estudiantes.

Club career
Ayala started his career with Estudiantes, having joined their academy at a young age. He was first promoted into the club's first-team squad in February 2019, with the defensive midfielder appearing on the substitute's bench for a Primera División match with Argentinos Juniors on 18 February; though manager Leandro Benítez didn't select him to come on in the 2–1 defeat. He went unused on the bench four further times up until December 2020. Ayala's senior debut eventually arrived on 23 December 2020, as he replaced brother David for the final thirteen minutes of a Copa de la Superliga play-off loss to Defensa y Justicia.

International career
In January 2017, Ayala received a call-up from the Argentina U17s. Across the next eighteen months, Ayala was selected to train against the senior squad; including at the 2018 FIFA World Cup in Russia. Also in 2018, Ayala appeared at the COTIF Tournament with the U20s; a competition they won.

On 17 February 2021, Ayala was loaned out to Primera Nacional club Agropecuario until the end of the year. In January 2022, Ayala was loaned out once again, this time to Ferro Carril Oeste until the end of 2022.

Personal life
Ayala's brother, David, is also a professional footballer; they both started their careers with Estudiantes. They have three other brothers, who also play football, and four sisters.

Career statistics
.

Honours
Argentina U20
COTIF Tournament: 2018

Notes

References

External links

2000 births
Living people
People from Berazategui Partido
Argentine footballers
Argentina youth international footballers
Argentina under-20 international footballers
Association football midfielders
Argentine Primera División players
Primera Nacional players
Estudiantes de La Plata footballers
Club Agropecuario Argentino players
Ferro Carril Oeste footballers
Sportspeople from Buenos Aires Province